Matthew Tremont (born March 9, 1989) is an American professional wrestler and promoter, best known for his work in Combat Zone Wrestling (CZW). He is also known for his appearances for his own promotion, Hardcore Hustle Organisation (H2O), as well as for Game Changer Wrestling. He has also worked for IWA Mid-South, IWA Deep-South and IWA East Coast.

Among his honours, he is a one-time CZW World Heavyweight Champion and one-time GCW World Champion. He also has the distinction of being the only wrestler to win all the major American deathmatch tournaments: Tournament Of Death once, Masters of Pain once and King of the Deathmatch twice. As such, he is often referred to as "The Grandslam Champion" of deathmatch.

Outside of wrestling, Tremont owns a store in the Berlin Farmers Market called Bulldozer's Collectibles.

Professional wrestling career

Combat Zone Wrestling (2011–2019)
Tremont made his Combat Zone Wrestling debut at Prelude to Violence defeating Pinkie Sanchez in a Tournament of Death X Qualifying Ultraviolent Rules on June 11, 2011. Tremont made his first Tournament of Death appearance at TOD X, defeating Necro Butcher in a "Water Jugs, Bats & Anything Else you Can Swing Match" in the quarterfinals. He was eliminated by MASADA in the semifinals in a "Kenzans, Whips & Anything Else we Can F***ing Find Match". Tremont began a small feud with Danny Havoc at Cage of Death 13 in an Ultraviolent Pits deathmatch which soon culminated at CZW Super Saturday, when Havoc defeated Tremont in an Ultraviolent Rules match. Tremont made his second Tournament of Death appearance at Tournament of Death XI, losing to Abdullah Kobayashi in the first round in an "Ultraviolent Bats" match.

Tremont began to feud with CZW owner D. J. Hyde throughout 2012, beginning at Tangled Web V as Hyde was the victor. He was subsequently fired at Down With The Sickness, after defeating Solo with a very stiff chair shot to the head, ending the bout at 35 seconds. Tremont got back on the microphone and repeated "Redemption" over and over again. At Night of Infamy, Hyde cut a promo on not reinstating Tremont. This prompted the locker room to walk out and quit if Tremont is not reinstated, but Hyde insisted if Tremont wins a match he could be reinstated. He would team up with New Jack the same night, defeating Joe Gacy and Ron Mathis. Tremont was successful at Cage of Death XIV, winning with a Death Valley driver off the top of the cage through three levels of panes of glass and a stage setup on the outside. After the match, the entire locker room congratulated Tremont for his efforts.

He later feuded with Devon Moore and The Nation Of Intoxication leading to several matches between the two. At Tangled Web 7, Tremont defeated Moore in the Tangled Web Match after knocking him off the scaffolding into the ring below.

In early 2015, Tremont began teaming with newcomer Stockade. They fought The Nation Of Intoxication at To Live Is To Die in January, they lost after Tremont accidentally struck Stockade with a chair. After the match, Stockade and Tremont came to blows then Tremont challenged Stockade to an Ultraviolent Match at Sixteen on February 21.

On August 8, 2015, Tremont defeated BLK Jeez for the CZW World Heavyweight Championship. At Down with the Sickness, after a 399-day reign as champion, Tremont lost the title in a four way deathmatch to Jonathan Gresham which also featured Greg Excellent and Joe Gacy.

Tremont would turn heel at Cage of Death 18, by attacking his own teammate Joey Janela during the Cage of Death match, costing his team the match in the process. He later rechristened himself as "Father" Matthew Tremont and reformed his alliance with Stockade. They would go on to attack Janela and Penelope Ford.

On August 5, 2017, Tremont had a No Ropes Barbed Wire Exploding Baseball Bats match against Japanese deathmatch wrestler, Atsushi Onita. The match would end in a No Contest.

On November 26, 2018, Tremont was challenged by D. J. Hyde to a tag team match at Cage of Death XX. He took Onita's help, while Hyde's partner was MASADA. On December 9, Tremont and Onita defeated Hyde and Masada, after Hyde was caught in the ropes and Tremont took a cinderblock to his head, pinning him when he fell down.

Other promotions
Tremont debuted for Beyond Wrestling on night one of Miracle Workers, losing to Devon Moore. He defeated TJ Marconi on day two of Ring Leaders. He now wrestles sporadically for Beyond Wrestling.

Tremont made his IWA Mid-South debut at the 2011 annual King of the Deathmatch, defeating MASADA in a Barbed Wire Board, Taipei Death & Sandpaper Kickpads match in the first round. He lost in the finals the second night to Drake Younger, other competitors were Devon Moore and Simon Sezz.

Tremont won his first biggest accomplishment by winning the 2012 Masters of Pain defeating MASADA in the finals in a Double Hell Deathmatch in Charleston, West Virginia.

On June 7, 2014, Tremont defeated Patrick Hayes in Connellsville, Pennsylvania to win the Vicious Outcast Wrestling (VOW) Anarchy Championship.
  
On June 26, 2014, Tremont won the IWA Mid South King Of The Death Matches. His run to the final included defeating Jesse Amato in a Best Of Seven Log Cabin Match, and John Wayne Murdoch and Ron Mathis in a Semi Final Three Way Fans Bring The Weapons Spider Net Match. In the final, he defeated Josh Crane in a No Rope Barbed Wire, Panes Of Glass, Barbed Wire Board, Casket And Fans Bring The Weapons Match, after putting Crane through a flaming pane of glass.

On July 21, 2018, Tremont became the first-ever Synergy Pro Wrestling Champion by defeating KTB in the finals of the promotion's inaugural Championship Tournament in Manville, New Jersey. Tremont held the Synergy Pro Wrestling Championship for 196 days, losing the title to Frightmare in a Triple Threat Match (that also included Drake Chambers) at Synergy Pro Wrestling 8 in Hillsborough, New Jersey.

A documentary about Tremont was released in 2021.

On January 23 Tremont along with Nick Gage at The Wrld on GCW (2022) ppv  answered the open challenge of The Briscoe Brothers and captured the GCW Tag Team titles for the first time.

Championships and accomplishments

Combat Zone Wrestling
CZW World Heavyweight Championship (1 time)
CZW Tournament Of Death 14 (2015)
Crimson Crown Wrestling
Crimson Cup (2019)
Game Changer Wrestling
GCW World Championship (1 time)
GCW Tag Team Championship (1 time) - with Nick Gage
GCW Nick Gage Invitational 2 (2017)
H2O Wrestling: Hardcore Hustle Organization
	H2O Heavyweight Championship (1 time)
IWA East Coast
Masters of Pain (2012)
IWA Deep South
Carnage Cup 9 (2013)
IWA Mid-South
King of the Deathmatch (2014, 2015)
	IndependentWrestling.tv
IWTV Independent Wrestling World Championship (1 time, current)
Pro Wrestling Illustrated
PWI ranked him #244 of the top 500 singles wrestlers in the PWI 500 in 2015
Synergy Professional Wrestling
Synergy Pro Wrestling Championship (1 time, Inaugural)
Synergy Pro Wrestling Championship Tournament (2018)
Superstars of Wrestling Federation
SWF Hardcore Championship (1 time)
Tier 1 Wrestling
Tier 1 Tag Team Championship (1 time, current) – with Stockade
Vicious Outcast Wrestling
VOW Anarchy Championship (2 times)
VOW Lord Of Anarchy (2015)
VOW Hyper Sonic Championship (1 times)
Women Superstars Uncensored
Queen and King of the Ring (2014) – with Mickie Knuckles

References

External links
 Matt Tremont: Profile and Match Listing
 Profile at Wrestlingdata
 Profile at CAGEMATCH

1989 births
Living people
American male professional wrestlers
Sportspeople from Atlantic City, New Jersey
Professional wrestlers from New Jersey
CZW World Heavyweight Champions